This is a list of museums in Lombardy, a region of Italy.
Please refer to the specific lists for the 
 Museums of the Province of Bergamo
 Museums of the Province of Brescia
 Museums of the Province of Como
 Museums of the Province of Cremona
 Museums of the Province of Lecco
 Museums of the Province of Lodi
 Museums of the Province of Mantua
 Museums of the Province of Milan (Museums in Milan)
 Museums of the Province of Pavia
 Museums of the Province of Sondrio
 Museums of the Province of Varese

Museum networks in Lombardy 
The museums of the Lombardy Region are organized in networks recognised officially by the region. There are different kind of networks: museum systems, regional networks of museums, networks of museums of the Lombardy Region for contemporary art and the network of ecomuseums of the Lombardy Region.

Museum systems

 Province of Bergamo
 Rete dei musei della Diocesi di Bergamo
 Sistema culturale integrato bassa pianura bergamasca
 Sistema museale “Triassico.it”
 Province of Brescia
 Montichiari Musei
 Sistema musei di Valle Camonica
 Sistema museale della Valle Sabbia
 Sistema museale della Valle Trompia
 Province of Como – Sistema museale territoriale Alpi Lepontine
 Province of Cremona
 Arte, cultura, storia fra Serio e Oglio
 Sistema museale della città di Cremona
 Province of Lecco
 Sistema museale della Provincia di Lecco
 Sistema Museale Urbano Lecchese (Si.M.U.L.)
 Province of Lodi – Sistema museale lodigiano
 Province of Mantua – Sistema provinciale dei musei e dei beni culturali mantovani 
 Province of Pavia
 Sistema museale d'Ateneo - Università di Pavia 
 Sistema museale locale Lomellina Musei
 Province of Sondrio – Sistema museale della Valchiavenna
 Province of Varese – SiMArch della Provincia di Varese

Regional networks of museums

Network of historic house museum
Museum for history
Network of botanical gardens
Network of archeological museums of the provinces of Brescia, Cremona and Mantua
Network of museums and ethnographical collections in Lombardy
Network of the 19th century in Lombardy
Network of Early Middle Ages

See also 
 List of museums in Province of Como
 List of museums in Province of Lecco
 List of museums in Province of Sondrio
 List of museums in Province of Varese
 List of museums in Italy

References

External links 

 Cultural observatory of Lombardy Region
 ISAL Istituto per la storia dell'arte lombarda

 
 
Lombardy